The 2021 Chinese Champions League, officially known as the  Sino-LAC 2021 Chinese Football Association Member Association Champions League for sponsorship reasons, was the 20th season since its establishment in 2002.

Team

From Champions League 

Teams promoted to China League Two

 Guangdong Lianghetang
 Xiamen Qudian
 Sichuan Huakun
 Yichun Jiangxi Tungsten Grand Tiger
 Hebei Jingying Zhihai
 Wuxi Xinje
 Quanzhou Addarmour
 Yanbian Hailanjiang
 Dandong Hantong
Teams relegated to CFA member associations leagues / cups or lower tiers

Other 7 teams from last season relegated to regional competitions.

To Champions League 

Teams qualified from CFA member associations leagues / cups

 Xi'an FA Cup
 Xi'an Ronghai
 Shaanxi National Super League
 Xi'an Hi-Tech Yilian
 Xinjiang FA Champions League
 Xinjiang Snowland Tiancheng
 Xinjiang Lingmengzhe
 Xinjiang Umud
 Kashgar Alifu
 Inner Mongolia Male Super League
 Urad Middle Banner Hasaer
 Dalad Banner Bohai
 Shandong Amateur Super League
 Weifang Juexiaoya
 Tai'an Huawei
 Jinan Xingzhou
 Shanxi FA Super League
 Shanxi Longchengren
 Tianjin FA Super League
 Tianjin Shengde
 Tianjin Yiteng Haitian Xinmei Zhicai

 Qingdao City Super League
 Qingdao N&E United
 Jiangsu FA Championship League
 Jiangsu Zhongnan Codion
 Guangxi Super League
 Guangxi Lanhang
 Guangxi Huaqiangu
 Liuzhou Ranko
 Chongqing Amateur League Super Division
 Chongqing Nerazzurri
 Chongqing Dikai
 Chengdu City Super League
 Chengdu Top Shine
 Wuhan City Super League
 Hubei Huachuang
 Kunming Football Tournament
 The Alliance of Guardians
 Fujian FA Super League
 Fuzhou Hengxing
 Fujian Quanzhou Qinggong

 Guangdong FA Super League
 Guangdong Red Treasure
 Zhuhai Qin'ao
 Meixian Qiuxiang
 Foshan Jion
 Jiangxi League
 Nanchang Honggu
 Hainan Football Super League
 Lingshui Dingli Jingcheng
 Zhejiang Super League Division A
 Shaoxing Shangyu Pterosaur
 Shanghai FA Super League Group A
 Shanghai Huajiao
 Shanghai Mitsubishi Heavy Industries Flying Lion
 Shanghai Huazheng

Teams qualified by recommendations

 Ningxia FA
 Ningxiaren Haixi
 Gansu FA
 Jingchuan Wenhui
 Lanzhou Taifeng
 Henan FA
 Henan Orient Classic
 Henan Baier
 Hebei FA
 Langfang Fenghua
 Liaoning FA
 Liaoning Leading
 Yingkou Chaoyue
 Anshan Feiyang

 Changchun FA
 Changchun Shenhua
 Yanbian FA
 Yanbian Sports School
 Nanjing FA
 Nanjing Tehu
 Yunnan FA
 Yunnan Yukun Steel
 Lijiang Yuanheng
 Sichuan FA
 Sichuan Tianfu

 Hubei FA
 Hubei Wuhan Athletics Zaiming
 Hunan FA
 Hunan X-Ray
 Xinjiang PCC FA
 Xinjiang Alar 359
 Anhui FA
 Anhui Litian
 Anhui OneCity

Name Changes 
Beijing City United F.C. moved to Zhuhai and changed their name to Zhuhai Qin'ao in January 2021.

Shanxi Zhisheng F.C. changed their name to Shanxi Longchengren in February 2021.

Dalian X-Ray F.C. moved to Loudi and changed their name to Hunan X-Ray in March 2021.

Meixian 433 F.C. changed their name to Meixian Qiuxiang in March 2021.

Sichuan Top Shine F.C. changed their name to Chengdu Top Shine in March 2021.

Tongyong Group F.C. changed their name to Guangdong Red Treasure in March 2021.

Weifang Juexiaoya F.C. moved to Zibo and changed their name to Zibo Qisheng in March 2021.

Xinjiang Xingdong Weilai F.C. changed their name to Xinjiang Lingmengzhe in March 2021.

Nanchang Teneng F.C. changed their name to Nanchang Honggu in June 2021.

Jingchuan Zhenpin F.C. changed their name to Jingchuan Wenhui in August 2021.

Urad Middle Banner Hasaer F.C. moved to Hohhot and changed their name to Inner Mongolia Hasaer in September 2021.

Qualified teams

Regional Competitions
The draw for the regional competitions took place on 31 August 2021.

Group A

Group B

Group C

Group D

Group E

Group F

Group G

Group H

Group I

Group J

Group K

Group L

Group M

Group N

Group O

Group P

Semi-finals
The 16 winners of the semi-finals will qualify for the Finals.

Finals

Finals

Group stage
The draw for the group stage took place on 9 November 2021.

Group A

Group B

Group C

Group D

Quarter-finals

Semi-finals

Final

Note

References

External links

2021 in Chinese football leagues